"Classic Man" is a song by Nigerian-American rapper Jidenna, released on February 3, 2015, as his commercial debut single by Epic Records. The song, which features vocals from fellow American singer Roman GianArthur, was included on Janelle Monáe's Wondaland Records collective EP, The Eephus, as the lead single. In December 2015, it was nominated for a Grammy Award for Best Rap/Sung Performance. The song was produced by Jidenna, alongside Nana Kwabena and Nate "Rocket" Wonder.

Composition
The song credits the writers of  Australian rapper Iggy Azalea's 2014 single "Fancy", which Jidenna attributes to the similarity between the two songs and the increased caution of the record industry following the copyright infringement verdict against "Blurred Lines".

Music video
The music video of the song was released to YouTube on February 20, 2015. The video shows Jidenna at a party, walking on the street, and at a martial arts school. The video was directed by Alan Ferguson. The music video for the remix was released on July 15, 2015. It features Jidenna and Kendrick Lamar rapping in various locations. Ty Dolla Sign, Janelle Monáe, Issa Rae, Roman GianArthur, and Hit-Boy make cameo appearances in the music video.

Commercial performance
"Classic Man" debuted at number 89 on the US Billboard Hot 100 for the chart dated May 23, 2015. The song peaked at number 22 in its sixteenth week on the chart. As of August 2015, the song has sold 399,000 copies in the US.

Remixes
Jidenna and Wondaland Records released a remix of the song featuring American rapper Kendrick Lamar, included as a bonus track on The Eephus EP. The remix was accompanied by a music video, which premiered on July 15, 2015. The remix is also featured in the video-games MLB The Show 16 and NBA Live 16. Jamaican rapper Sean Paul also released a remix of this song called "Ganja Man". T-Pain released a Jidenna approved remix called "Classic Man (T-Mix)", featuring Vantrease and Young Cash of Nappy Boy Entertainment.

Usage in popular media
A Chopped and screwed version of "Classic Man" featured in the Academy Award winning 2016 film Moonlight.  The track was also heard in the 2016 film Dirty Grandpa.

Charts

Weekly charts

Year-end charts

Certifications

References

2015 debut singles
2015 songs
Epic Records singles
Jidenna songs
Songs written by Charli XCX
Songs written by George Astasio
Songs written by Iggy Azalea
Songs written by Jason Pebworth
Songs written by Jon Shave
Songs written by Kurtis Mckenzie
Music videos directed by Alan Ferguson (director)